Tegeticula tehuacana is a moth of the family Prodoxidae. It is found in Mexico in Oaxaca, western- and south-western Veracruz, and central-northern Puebla centred on the Tehuacan Valley.

The wingspan is 20–24 mm for males and 22.5–26 mm for females. The forewings are white with a narrow band of dark brown scales. The hindwings are dark brownish grey. Adults are on wing in late April.

The larvae feed on Yucca periculosa and Yucca mixtecana.

Etymology
The species epithet refers to the Tehuacan desert region, which contains the known sites of the species.

References

Moths described in 2008
Prodoxidae